George H. "Zaney" Barker (1901 – April 23, 1986) was an athlete and coach, inducted into the Tennessee Sports Hall of Fame in 1983.

Early years
Barker was born near Falling Water, Tennessee and attended Baylor School. Dr. Guerry  persuaded Barker to enter Sewanee: The University of the South.

Sewanee
Barker played football, basketball, baseball, and golf. He played for the Sewanee Tigers football team as a quarterback from 1922 to 1925, and was captain of the 1925 team. The high-point of his football career was the defeat of Vanderbilt in 1924. He won the Porter Cup in 1925.

Coaching career
Barker returned in 1926 to the Baylor School as a member of the coaching staff and a teacher.

References

1901 births
1986 deaths
American football quarterbacks
People from Hamilton County, Tennessee
Players of American football from Tennessee
Sewanee Tigers football players
Baseball players from Tennessee
Basketball players from Tennessee
American men's basketball players